E-engineering is a concept that combines distance learning and remote laboratories.

History 
Distance learning education has been around since the 19th century when the development of the mail services in England enabled the delivering of correspondence courses by mail. In the second half of the 20th century, audio and television players where the first technological means used to deliver new, more engaging distance learning courses. And despite keeping the same way to communicate with students, the now more fast and reliable postal services, the materials were then much more diversified, ranging from carefully constructed texts and audio and video records to conventional broadcast radio and television, in this case, open to all, students and non-students. These were complemented by live individual or group sessions over the phone, between instructor and students, or among students, enabling real interactive teamwork.

Effect of Internet 
However, the breakthrough that represents a true turning point in distance learning was the introduction of the concept of e-learning during the 90s, boosted by the two most significant advances in the telecommunications area – the Internet network and the invention of the World Wide Web. With the Internet a fast, reliable and interactive channel of communication between instructor and students or among students was now available, enabling a degree of interaction never achieved before in distance learning and comparable to face-to-face classes. On the other hand, the World Wide Web with its hypertext links enabled the construction of much more diversified and engaging materials, supported by audio, image, and video, readily available and highly interactive. This was accompanied by the mass production of personal computers, which made them accessible and affordable.

Challenges 
In a decade, from 1990 to 2000, personal computers evolved from very expensive machines, complicated to operate and whose access was almost restricted to scientist and engineers and to technical university students, to indispensable household equipment. In spite of these advances, the undergraduate courses on offer were limited. Engineering courses which require the access to specific chemistry, physics, mechanics, electrical machines, electronics or optics laboratories and real-time interaction with equipment and instrumentation, were not available at distance.
This reality is changing due to the creation of remotely accessible laboratories that enable students to perform hands-on lab work remotely, with a level of interactivity and realism never achieved before. A lot of work is being done in the past decade in the area of remote laboratories.

Examples 
In the specialized literature, it is possible to find many examples of different labs for different areas of physics and electrical engineering, each one allowing different degrees of freedom in the configuration of the experiment by the remote user. 
The integration of these remote laboratories as part of fully online undergraduate programs in engineering areas enabled the creation of e-engineering courses. These are e-learning courses in engineering areas where students perform their hands-on laboratory work remotely interacting in real-time with equipment and instrumentation available online 24/7.
The first example of one such course is the L3-EOLES (Electronics and Optics e-Learning for Embedded Systems) course, an entirely online English-taught 3rd year bachelor's degree in Electronics and Optics for Embedded Systems. The course, that started being offered in the school year 2014/15, is currently in its fourth edition. Designed as a specialization year, this course is oriented towards a currently expanding field in the electrical and computer engineering area, the field of electronics and optics for embedded systems. This area of knowledge requires students to be able to perform experimental work to acquire the expected technical experimental skills. The execution of laboratory assignments over the Internet required the development of remotely accessible experimental laboratories enabling students to interact in real-time with real experimental setups. This course has been accredited by educational authorities in Tunisia, Morocco, and France.

References

Distance education
Engineering education